Héctor Antonio Hoffens Valenzuela (born 3 January 1957) is a Chilean former footballer who played as a forward.

Honours

Club
Universidad de Chile
Copa Chile: 1979
Segunda División: 1989

Individual
 Chilean Footballer of the Year: 1989

References

External links
 

Living people
1957 births
Chilean footballers
Association football forwards
Universidad de Chile footballers
Ferroviarios footballers
Audax Italiano footballers
Primera B de Chile players
Chilean Primera División players
Chilean people of German descent